Paolo Regoli (born 24 April 1991) is an Italian footballer who plays as a midfielder for  club San Donato.

Club career
He made his Serie C debut for Pontedera on 1 September 2013 in a game against Grosseto.

He joined Pistoiese in the summer of 2017.

On 27 August 2019, he signed with Pianese.

On 3 September 2020 he joined San Donato in Serie D.

References

External links
 

1991 births
Living people
People from Pontedera
Footballers from Tuscany
Sportspeople from the Province of Pisa
Italian footballers
Association football midfielders
Serie B players
Serie C players
Serie D players
U.S. Città di Pontedera players
U.S. Avellino 1912 players
Latina Calcio 1932 players
U.S. Livorno 1915 players
Mantova 1911 players
U.S. Pistoiese 1921 players
U.S. Pianese players
San Donato Tavarnelle players
Universiade gold medalists for Italy
Universiade medalists in football